Opisthotropis haihaensis, the Hai Ha mountain stream keelback,  is a species of natricine snake found in China and Vietnam.

References

Opisthotropis
Reptiles described in 2019
Reptiles of China
Reptiles of Vietnam